Sebastian Kris (born 19 April 1999) is a New Zealand international rugby league footballer who plays as a  for the Canberra Raiders in the NRL.

Background
Kris was born in Brisbane, Queensland and is of Indigenous Australian, South African and Maori descent. Kris played his first junior rugby league for the Wests Panthers. 

He moved to Canberra at the age of eight and played his junior rugby league for the Tuggeranong Valley Dragons.

Playing career

2019
Kris made his first grade debut in Round 10 of the 2019 NRL season for Canberra against South Sydney at Canberra Stadium.

2020
Kris spent the entirety of the 2020 NRL season away from Canberra, leading to him not being re-signed. Kris was later re-signed by the Canberra club for the 2021 NRL season and played in their Round 1 clash against the Wests Tigers.

2021
In round 24 of the 2021 NRL season, he scored two tries for Canberra in a 28-16 victory over the New Zealand Warriors.

2022
In round 23 of the 2022 NRL season, Kris scored two tries for Canberra in a 28-22 victory over Newcastle.

References

External links
Canberra Raiders profile

1999 births
Living people
Australian rugby league players
Australian people of New Zealand descent
Australian people of South African descent
Canberra Raiders players
Indigenous Australian rugby league players
New Zealand national rugby league team players
Rugby league second-rows
Rugby league centres
Rugby league players from Brisbane